"Underground" is a song from Ben Folds Five's 1995 self-titled debut album. It was written by Ben Folds. The song is about geeks and social outcasts looking for solace in numbers in underground music and art scenes. It peaked at #37 on the UK Singles Chart. The track was #3 for the year of 1996 on Australia's Triple J Hottest 100.

History
Ben Folds has spoken of feeling a social outcast at times and finding it hard to make friends  as a child because his family was constantly moving. As he found initial success with the band Majosha and then forming Ben Folds Five with Darren Jessee and Robert Sledge, he began to recognize members of his audiences as similar types of outcasts. He noted that these types of people, who were in search of their own identities, would often find themselves gravitating towards the underground scenes (punk, ska, hardcore, etc.) of independent music. They would latch onto the scenes with particular fervor.

"Underground" is both an ode to and castigation of these type of people, as well as the perceived notions of the underground scene looking in from the outside. As Folds says:

A catchy, raucous romp laced with falsetto, the track became the first international commercial single and first U.S. radio single from the album Ben Folds Five. It introduced the band to the world and remains the most well-known track on the album and one of the most well-known songs of the band's career, second only to "Brick".

The song was among the most popular performed at Ben Folds Five concerts. It featured a degree of audience participation, including coordinated sound effects and retorts to various lines throughout the song. Folds continues to perform the song occasionally during his solo career.

Additional versions
Two distinct edited versions of the song exist. A radio edit version appears with the original album cut on a 1995 promotional CD sent to radio programmers in the United States, as well as a CD sent to the United Kingdom for the same purpose. The radio edit version also appears on a second promotional CD for the United Kingdom released in 1996.

The second edited version, a shortened version of the album cut of the song, was released as a commercial CD single in the United Kingdom in April 1996 by Vital Distribution for Passenger/Caroline. This version was released on a 7" vinyl single in the U.K. at the same time. A second 7" vinyl single was released in the U.K. in September 1996.

A live audio version of the song was released in August, 1996, in the United Kingdom by Vital Distribution as part of a 2-disc CD single set. Recorded August 12, 1995, at Ziggy's in Winston-Salem, North Carolina, by John Alagia and Doug Derryberry, this live version appears with the album cut of the song on the second disc of the set. The first disc of the set features the second edited studio version of the song.

The live audio version also appears on the 1998 compilation and rarities album Naked Baby Photos.

A live video version, filmed in New York on June 9, 1997, for the PBS program Sessions at West 54th, appears on the 2001 music concert DVD Ben Folds Five – The Complete Sessions at West 54th.

Music video
The music video was directed by David Hale. It depicts the band performing in an Old West saloon as Western fighting and other hijinks occur around them.

Singles

U.S. promotional CD single
Released in 1995 to radio programmers in the United States to promote the song and the album Ben Folds Five. Features the album cut of the song and a radio edit version that differs from a second edit found on the commercial single releases.
Underground (Radio Edit)  – 3:17
Underground (Album Version)  – 4:20

UK promotional CD single
Released in 1995 to radio programmers in the United Kingdom to promote the song and the album Ben Folds Five. Features the album cut of the song and a radio edit version that differs from a second edit found on the commercial single releases.
Underground (Radio Edit)  – 3:17
Underground (Album Version)  – 4:20

UK commercial CD single
Released in April 1996 in the United Kingdom by Vital Distribution for Passenger/Caroline. Features a second edited version of the song that is shorter than the album cut but longer than the radio edit version.
Underground (Edit #2)  – 3:36
Sports & Wine (Album Version)  – 2:58
Boxing (Album Version)  – 4:42

UK commercial 7" vinyl single
Released in April 1996 in the United Kingdom by Vital Distribution for Passenger/Caroline. Features a second edited version of the song that is shorter than the album cut but longer than the radio edit version.
Side A: Underground (Edit #2)  – 3:36
Side B: Sports & Wine (Album Version)  – 2:58

Second UK promotional CD single
Released in 1996 to radio programmers in the United Kingdom to promote the song and the album Ben Folds Five. Features the radio edit version that differs from the edit found on the commercial single releases. The other tracks on the single were recorded live on August 12, 1995, at Ziggy's in Winston-Salem, North Carolina, by John Alagia and Doug Derryberry. The tracks were mixed by Alagia, Derryberry, and John Altschiller at Bias Recording Studios in Springfield, Virginia, and were mastered by Dave Glasser at Airshow in Springfield. "Satan is My Master" also appears on Naked Baby Photos.
Underground (Radio Edit)  – 3:36
Satan is My Master (Live)  – 1:31
Video (Live)  – 4:10

UK commercial 2-CD single set
Released in April 1996 in the United Kingdom by Vital Distribution for Passenger/Caroline. Features a second edited version of the song on the first disc that is shorter than the album cut but longer than the radio edit version. The album cut and a live version of the song appear on the second disc. The other tracks were recorded live on August 12, 1995, at Ziggy's in Winston-Salem, North Carolina, by John Alagia and Doug Derryberry. The tracks were mixed by Alagia, Derryberry, and John Altschiller at Bias Recording Studios in Springfield, Virginia, and were mastered by Dave Glasser at Airshow in Springfield. The live version of "Underground" and "Satan is My Master" both also appear on Naked Baby Photos.
Disc One
Underground (Radio Edit)  – 3:36
Satan is My Master (Live)  – 1:31
Video (Live)  – 4:10
Disc Two
Underground (Album Version)  – 4:12
Jackson Cannery (Live)  – 4:05
Underground (Live)  – 5:14

Personnel
Ben Folds – piano, vocals
Darren Jessee – drums, vocals, percussion
Robert Sledge – bass, vocals

Production
Producer: Caleb Southern
Mixing: Marc Becker

References

Ben Folds Five songs
1996 singles
Songs written by Ben Folds
1995 songs
Caroline Records singles